John Dewberry, born 04/28/1963 was a starting quarterback for the Georgia Tech Yellow Jackets football team from 1983 to 1985. He graduated from Milton High School.  He played for the Calgary Stampeders of the Canadian Football League before starting his first company in 1989.  Today, he is an Atlanta real estate developer.

After the 1981 season, John Dewberry left the University of Georgia football team due to lack of playing time, and he transferred to Georgia Tech. Dewberry helped Georgia Tech defeat Georgia in two straight games. Dewberry also initiated the tradition of Georgia Tech players taking pieces of the Hedges after a Tech football win in Athens.

See also
 List of Georgia Tech Yellow Jackets starting quarterbacks
 Georgia Tech Yellow Jackets football statistical leaders

References

External links
 John Dewberry Stats - Sports Reference / College Football

Living people
American football quarterbacks
Georgia Tech Yellow Jackets football players
Calgary Stampeders players
Canadian football quarterbacks
Year of birth missing (living people)
Players of American football from Georgia (U.S. state)
Sportspeople from Fulton County, Georgia